Arctobius is a genus of tangled nest spiders containing the single species, Arctobius agelenoides. It was  first described by Pekka T. Lehtinen in 1967, with a holarctic distribution.

References

External links

Amaurobiidae
Holarctic spiders
Monotypic Araneomorphae genera
Taxa named by Pekka T. Lehtinen